"No comment" is a phrase used to avoid answering questions from journalists.

No Comment may also refer to:

 No Comment (band), an American band, active from 1987 to 1993
 No Comment (Front 242 album), 1984
 No Comment (Van Gogh album), 1997
 No Comment, an album by Nitro, 2018
 No Comment, a segment on the TV network Euronews
 Nocom (an abbreviated version of No Comment), a major exploit on the Minecraft server 2b2t